Jonjo O'Neill (born 11 July 1978) is an actor from Northern Ireland known for his stage and television work.

O'Neill was born in Belfast, grew up in the Whiterock Road area and was educated at St Mary's Grammar School and the Royal Belfast Academical Institution. Growing up he was passionate about musical theatre and was a member of Ulster Youth Theatre and performed with the Ulster Theatre Company. In 1996 at the age of 18 he won a place and a full scholarship to the Guildford School of Acting, and moved to England.  His first television role was the year he graduated from drama school, in Extremely Dangerous (1999).

A member of the Royal Shakespeare Company (RSC) 2009-2011 ensemble, his roles included Mercutio in Romeo and Juliet, Orlando in As You Like It, and Launcelot in Morte D'Arthur. His performances during the RSC's six-week residency at Park Avenue Armory in New York were hailed as "forceful"  and "irresistible." At the 2012 World Shakespeare Festival in Stratford-upon-Avon, O'Neill played the title role in Roxana Silbert's production of Richard III at the Swan Theatre.

In 2012 he won praise for his performance in Lucy Prebble's play The Effect at the Royal National Theatre headlining alongside Billie Piper, whom he later appeared alongside in the 2013 fiftieth anniversary episode of Doctor Who: "The Day of the Doctor". He also appeared in "The Mortal Remains," the final vignette in the Coen brothers's film The Ballad of Buster Scruggs (2018).

Filmography

Film
Fakers (2004) - Micky
Defiance (2008) - Lazar
As You Like It (2010) - Orlando
On Chesil Beach (2017) - Phil
The Ballad of Buster Scruggs (2018) - Englishman (segment "The Mortal Remains")
We Are Where We Are (2018, Short) - Magnus
Rare Beasts (2019) - Dougie
The Drifters (2019) - Chris
Here Before (2021) - Brendan
Operation Mincemeat (film) (2021) - Teddy

Television
Sunburn (2000) - Ivan
Holby City (2000) - Kieran
Band of Brothers (2001) - Replacement One
A Touch of Frost (2002) - Jeffrey Meadows
Murphy's Law (2003) - Johnny McEvoy
The Bill (2007) - Billy McLaughlin
Doctor Who (2013, Episode: "The Day of the Doctor") - McGilliop
Constantine (2014) - Gary "Gaz" Lester
The Fall (2014–2016) - Tom Stagg, Series regular
Dragonheart 3: The Sorcerer's Curse (2015) - Brude
Fortitude (2015) - Ciaran Donnelly
Vera (2017) - Gary Tovey
Oasis (2017) - David Morgan
Patrick Melrose (2018) - Seamus Dourke
Pennyworth (2019-2021) - Aleister Crowley
The Queen's Gambit (2020) - Mr. Ganz
The Irregulars (2021) - Mycroft Holmes
Dalgliesh (TV series) (2021) - Julius Marsh
 Bad Sisters (TV series)’’ (2022) - Donal Flynn
Bloodlands (TV series) (2022) - Ryan Savage

Theatre
The Frogs (1999) – Nottingham Playhouse
Translations (2000) – Watford Palace Theatre
Half a Sixpence (2000) – West Yorkshire Playhouse
Dolly West's Kitchen (2001) – Leicester Haymarket Theatre
Observe the Sons of Ulster (2002) – The Pleasance Theatre
Murmuring Judges (2003) – Birmingham Repertory Theatre
A View from the Bridge (2003) – Birmingham Repertory Theatre/West Yorkshire Playhouse
Paradise Lost (2004) – Northampton Theatre Royal
Headcase (2004) – Royal Shakespeare Company
Speaking Like Magpies (2005) – Royal Shakespeare Company
Sejanus: His Fall (2005) – Royal Shakespeare Company
Believe What You Will (2005) – Royal Shakespeare Company
A New Way to Please You (2005) – Royal Shakespeare Company
Faustus (2006) – Hampstead Theatre
Someone Else's Shoes (2007) – Soho Theatre
As You Like It (2008) – Young Vic Theatre
Comedy of Errors (2009) – Royal Shakespeare Company
As you Like It (2009) – Royal Shakespeare Company
The Drunks (2009) – Royal Shakespeare Company
Romeo and Juliet (2010) – Royal Shakespeare Company
Morte D'Arthur (2010) – Royal Shakespeare Company
Ahasverus (2011) – Royal Shakespeare Company
Silence (2011) – Royal Shakespeare Company
Richard III (2012) – Royal Shakespeare Company
The Effect (2012–13) – Royal National Theatre
Collaborations (2013) – Royal Court Theatre
The President Has come to See You (2013) – Royal Court Theatre
Talk Show (2013) – Royal Court Theatre
The Get Out (2014) – Royal Court Theatre
The Crucible by Arthur Miller – Royal Exchange Theatre Manchester (2015) for which he was nominated for a Manchester Theatre Award
Cymbeline (2015–16) – Globe Theatre
The Unreachable (2016) – Royal Court Theatre
The Bash (2016) – Royal Court Theatre 50th Anniversary Gala, performing as Frank-N-Furter from The Rocky Horror Show
Victory Condition (2017) – Royal Court Theatre
The Prudes (2018) – Royal Court Theatre
Pinter at the Pinter (2018) – Harold Pinter Theatre
Dear Elizabeth (2019) – Gate Theatre (one performance only)

References

External links

Jonjo O'Neill Official Site

1978 births
Alumni of the Guildford School of Acting
Living people
Male stage actors from Northern Ireland
Male television actors from Northern Ireland
Male actors from Belfast